Kageneckia oblonga (also known as bollen) is a species of plant in the family Rosaceae. It is endemic to Chile. K. oblonga is an evergreen tree.  It grows from Coquimbo to Malleco (29 to 38°S). Example occurrences are found specifically found in central Chile within the La Campana National Park and Cerro La Campana forest areas. In these areas the endangered Chilean Wine Palm, Jubaea chilensis is an associated tree species.

Description
It is an evergreen small tree or shrub that measures up to 5 m (16 ft) tall, the leaves are alternate, very leathery, with toothed edge and oblong shaped, the leaves are petiolate, yellowish-green, about 3–6 cm long. The flowers are unisexual  star-shaped and white, solitary or clustered in axillary inflorescences. The calyx is formed by 5 sepals, the corolla is made up by 5 petals. The male ones have 15-20 stamens. The fruit is a pentamerous star-shaped capsule, about 2–3 cm in diameter. The seeds are winged.

Uses
The wood is very hard and it is used for elaborating tools, in traditional medicine it is used as emetic and laxative.

Etymology
Kageneckia in honour of Frederick von Kageneck, Austrian ambassador to Madrid. Oblonga refers to the shape of the leaves.

References

C. Michael Hogan. 2008. Chilean Wine Palm: Jubaea chilensis, GlobalTwitcher.com, ed. Nicklas Stromberg
Torrey Botanical Club. 1905. Bulletin of the Torrey Botanical Club

External links

oblonga
Trees of Chile